GTO may refer to:

Entertainment
 Great Teacher Onizuka, a manga, anime, live-action series, and film
 GameTable Online, a game portal

Music bands
 GTO (band), an Australian band
 The GTOs, an American girl group
 Giraffe Tongue Orchestra, an American band
 Greater Than One, an English electronic music band

Other music uses
 GTO: Gangsters Takin' Over, an album by Oran "Juice" Jones
 GTO Records, a British record label
 "GTO" (Ronny & the Daytonas song), 1964 
 "GTO" (Sinitta song), 1987

Science and technology
 Gate turn-off thyristor
 Gaussian-type orbital
 Geostationary transfer orbit
 Golgi tendon organ

Transport
 Gorton railway station, in Greater Manchester, England
 Jalaluddin Airport (IATA: GTO) in Gorontalo, Indonesia
 Grand Touring Over, a category for production cars
 Gran Turismo Omologata, a model name of several grand tourer automobiles:
 Ferrari 250 GTO
 Ferrari 288 GTO
 Ferrari 599 GTO
 Pontiac GTO
 Mitsubishi Galant GTO
 Mitsubishi GTO
 HSV GTO

Other uses
 Geographic targeting order issued by the United States Secretary of Treasury
 Guanajuato, Mexico
 Ready for Labour and Defence of the USSR (Russian: , Gotov k trudu i oborone SSSR), a Soviet physical training programme